Jernej Kruder (born December 5, 1990) is a Slovenian boulderer, sport climber and rock climber. In 2018, he won the IFSC Climbing World Cup in bouldering.

Biography
The route was originally established by Chris Sharma in 2006. Jernej was only the second climber to repeat it. It took him 16 days and 39 attempts to finish the route. Jernej initially rated the route . Jan Hojer, who got the third ascend on the route, downgraded it to 9a+.

In September 2018 he managed to get the first ascent on the boulder Metafizika near Celje, Slovenia.

On 31 December 2018 Jernej made the first ascent of Dugi rat at the crag Vrulja close to Omiš in Croatia. With a grade of  it is the hardest sport climbing route in the country. Jernej bolted the route himself and had been working on it for 4 years. The name Dugi rat means "long cape/horn" in Croatian.

Rankings

Climbing World Cup

Climbing World Championships 
Youth

Adult

Rock Master

Number of medals in the Climbing World Cup

Bouldering

References

External links 

 Kruder's profile on Digitalrock.de

Slovenian rock climbers
Living people
1990 births
IFSC Climbing World Cup overall medalists
Boulder climbers